EGHS may refer to:
 Eagle Grove High School, Eagle Grove, Iowa, United States
 East Gadsden High School, Gadsden County, Florida, United States
 East Gaston High School, Mount Holly, North Carolina, United States
 East Greenwich High School, East Greenwich, Rhode Island, United States
 Eastern Guilford High School, Gibsonville, North Carolina, United States
 Eau Gallie High School, Melbourne, Florida, United States
 Elk Grove High School (Elk Grove, California), United States
 Elk Grove High School (Elk Grove Village, Illinois), United States